Loafer is a suspense thrillerNepali film based on the story of unemployed people. It stars Aryan Sigdel, Dayahang Rai, Sushil Raj Pandey, Kamal Mani Nepal, Anupam Sharma and Sagar Lamsal Chettri, as well as debutant Rajani KC.The movie was released in maximum number of theatres in Nepalese history It was Hit at Box Office, it was appreciated by audience and film makers.

Cast 
 Aryan Sigdel as Inspector
 Dayahang Rai as Vanta
 Sushil Raj Pandey as Arjun
 Kamal Mani Nepal as Driver
 Sagar Lamsal Chettri as Padey
 Anupam Sharma as Parvesh

Soundtrack

References

External links
https://www.youtube.com/watch?v=vKXWVt7-LyI

2013 films
Nepalese thriller films